Austroagrion is a genus of damselflies belonging to the family Coenagrionidae.
Species of Austroagrion are small damselflies; males are black with blue or green markings while females are paler. 
Austroagrion occurs in Papua New Guinea, New Caledonia and Australia.

Species 
The genus Austroagrion includes the following species:

Austroagrion cyane  
Austroagrion exclamationis  
Austroagrion kiautai  
Austroagrion pindrina  
Austroagrion watsoni

References

Coenagrionidae
Zygoptera genera
Odonata of Oceania
Odonata of Australia
Taxa named by Robert John Tillyard
Insects described in 1913
Damselflies